Martolci is a village in the municipality of Čaška, North Macedonia. It used to be part of the former municipality of Izvor.

Demographics
According to the 2021 census, the village had a total of 122 inhabitants. Ethnic groups in the village include:

Macedonians 113
Others 9

Sports
The local football club FK Babuna plays in the OFS Veles.

References

Villages in Čaška Municipality